Satara Lok Sabha constituency is one of the 48 Lok Sabha (parliamentary) constituencies in Maharashtra state in western India, in Satara district.

Assembly segments
Presently, Satara Lok Sabha constituency comprises the following six Vidhan Sabha (legislative assembly) segments:

Members of Parliament

Election results

General elections 1951

General elections 1957

General elections 1962

General elections 1967

General elections 1971

General elections 1977

General elections 1980

General elections 1984

General elections 1989

General elections 1991

General elections 1996

General elections 1998

General elections 1999

General elections 2004

General elections 2009

General elections 2014

General elections 2019

By Election 2019

See also
 Satara district
 List of Constituencies of the Lok Sabha
 Satara Assembly constituency

References

External links
Satara lok sabha  constituency election 2019 results details

Lok Sabha constituencies in Maharashtra
Satara (city)